Timothy "Thady" O'Connor (1867 - 24 April 1951) was an Irish hurler who played for the Cork senior team.

Born in Aghabullogue, County Cork, O'Connor first played competitive hurling in his youth. He came to prominence with the Aghabullogue club, winning one championship medal in 1890. Aghabullogue subsequently represented Cork in the inter-county series of games, with O'Connor winning a set of All-Ireland and Munster medals.

O'Connor worked initially as a coachman before finding employment as a farm labourer. At the time of his death he was the last surviving member of Cork's 1890 All-Ireland-winning team.

Honours

Player

 Aghabullogue
 Cork Senior Hurling Championship (1): 1890

 Cork
 All-Ireland Senior Hurling Championship: 1890
 Leinster Senior Hurling Championship (4): 1890

References

1867 births
1951 deaths
Aghabullogue hurlers
Cork inter-county hurlers
All-Ireland Senior Hurling Championship winners